Lake Karrinyup Country Club is a private golf club located in Karrinyup, Western Australia. The golf club consists of an 18-hole championship golf course, and a 9-hole "short course". The championship layout at Lake Karrinyup was founded in 1928, designed by Alex Russell who was the Australian partner of the famed golf course architect, Alister MacKenzie.

Course

Overview 
The championship course is a par-72 layout that winds its way through undulating ground, native gum-trees, and indigenous vegetation. Designed by Alex Russell in 1928 and opened for play in 1930, the course has seen a number of changes in its lifetime. The most significant changes occurred between 2007 and 2008, when Michael Clayton Golf Design was enlisted to undertake a significant overhaul of the golf course to return it, aesthetically and architecturally, to Alex Russell's principles.

Dominated by the lake from which the course gets its name, the most memorable holes are ones which run adjacent to and over this natural feature. The signature 8th hole is a 201-metre par 3 which requires a shot that carries the lake onto a raised green. Also notable is the  par-5 3rd hole which is flanked along its length by the lake, and the short  par-4 14th which, due to clever bunkering, presents a number of options off the tee.

Scorecard 
The championship course scorecard is as follows. Please note that all measurements are from the Black (Championship) tees.

Rankings 
Lake Karrinyup is consistently ranked as one of the top 20 courses in Australia. A slip in its ranking early in the 2000s was part of the motive for the Clayton redesign.

Events 
Lake Karrinyup has played host to four Australian Opens (1952, 1960, 1968, 1974), two Lake Karrinyup Bowls (1963, 1964), two Johnnie Walker Classics (2002, 2003), and was the venue for the Perth International since 2012.

References

External links
Lake Karrinyup Country Club Profile, Golf Australia

Golf clubs and courses in Western Australia
Sports venues in Perth, Western Australia
Karrinyup, Western Australia